Events from the year 1746 in Sweden

Incumbents
 Monarch – Frederick I

Events
 - A new sumptuary law bans the use of hooped skirts wider than 4.5 ells.
 9 December –  Carl Gustaf Tessin succeed Carl Gyllenborg as Privy Council Chancellery.
 - Eva Ekeblad present the result of how to make flour and alcohol out of potatoes to the Royal Swedish Academy of Sciences.

Births
 24 January – Gustav III of Sweden, monarch  (died 1792) 
 January 31 - Pehr Hörberg, artist, painter and musician (died 1816)
 24 February – Uno von Troil, Archbishop of Uppsala  (died 1803)
 14 December - Julie Alix de la Fay, ballerina (died 1826)
 - Andreas Berlin, naturalist (died 1773)
 - Peter Jacob Hjelm, chemist and the first person to isolate the element molybdenum  (died 1813)
 - Ulrika Fredrika Bremer, shipowner (died 1798)
 - Eric Ruuth, Governor-General of Swedish Pomerania (died 1820)
 - Lovisa Simson, theater director (died 1808)
 Hedda Piper, courtier (died 1812)

Deaths

 
 
 
 9 December – Carl Gyllenborg, politician (born 1679)

References

 
Years of the 18th century in Sweden
Sweden